C. Belmont Faries (June 3, 1913 – January 19, 1998), of Washington, D.C., was a philatelist who dedicated his entire career to editing philatelic publications.

Philatelic editing
Faries edited a number of philatelic journals including the SPA Journal (of the Society of Philatelic Americans), the Minkus Stamp and Coin Journal, and the U.S. Specialist. He contributed to various journals and publications, including Scott's Monthly Journal and Stamp Collector newspaper, and was the stamp hobby columnist for the Washington Star.

Philatelic activity
Belmont was a member of the Citizens' Stamp Advisory Committee for the U.S. Post Office Department, and continued his work with the committee when it was reorganized as the U.S. Postal Service on July 1, 1971.

Honors and awards
Faries was awarded the Lagerloef Award by the Society of Philatelic Americans in 1969 and the Luff Award for Exceptional Contributions to Philately in 1992. He was named to the American Philatelic Society Hall of Fame in 2001.

Legacy
Faries donated his library, notes, and working papers to the American Philatelic Research Library.

See also
 Philately
 Philatelic literature

References
 C. Belmont Faries

1913 births
1998 deaths
Philatelic literature
American philatelists
People from Washington, D.C.
American Philatelic Society